The Battle of the Camel, also known as the Battle of Jamel or the Battle of Basra, took place outside of Basra, Iraq, in 36 AH (656 CE). The battle was fought between the army of the fourth caliph Ali, on one side, and the rebel army led by Aisha, Talha and Zubayr, on the other side. Ali was the cousin and son-in-law of the Islamic prophet Muhammad, while Aisha was a widow of Muhammad, of whom Talha and Zubayr were both prominent companions. Ali emerged victorious from the battle, Talha and Zubayr were both killed, and Aisha was sent back to Hejaz afterward. The triumvirate had revolted against Ali ostensibly to avenge the assassination of the third caliph Uthman, although Aisha and Talha are both known to have actively opposed him. The three also called for the removal of Ali from office and for a Qurayshite council (shura) with Talha and Zubayr to appoint his successor.

Background

Opposition to Uthman 
Ali frequently accused the third caliph Uthman of deviating from the Quran and the Sunna, and he was joined in this criticism by most of the senior companions, including Talha and Zubayr. Uthman was also widely accused of nepotism, corruption, and injustice, and Ali is known to have protested his conduct, including his lavish gifts for his kinsmen. Ali also protected outspoken companions, such as Abu Dharr and Ammar, against the wrath of the caliph. Ali appears in early sources as a restraining influence on Uthman without directly opposing him. Some supporters of Ali were part of the opposition to Uthman, joined in their efforts by Talha and Zubayr, who were both companions of Muhammad, and by his widow Aisha. The last was critical of Uthman for religious innovations and nepotism, but also objected to him for reducing her pension. Among the supporters of Ali were Malik al-Ashtar and other religiously-learned . These wanted to see Ali as the next caliph, though there is no evidence that he communicated or coordinated with them. Ali is also said to have rejected the requests to lead the rebels, although he might have sympathized with their grievances, and was thus considered a natural focus for the opposition, at least morally. It is also likely that some companions supported the protests with the hope of either deposing Uthman, or changing his policies, thus underestimating the severity of the opposition to Uthman.

Assassination of Uthman 

As their grievances mounted, discontented groups from provinces began arriving in Medina in 35/656. On their first attempt, the Egyptian opposition sought the advice of Ali, who urged them to send a delegation to negotiate with Uthman, unlike Talha and Ammar ibn Yasir, who might have encouraged the Egyptians to advance on the town. Ali similarly asked the Iraqi opposition to avoid violence, which was heeded. He also acted as a mediator between Uthman and the provincial dissidents more than once to address their economical and political grievances. In particular, he negotiated and guaranteed on behalf of Uthman the promises that persuaded the rebels to return home and ended the first siege. Ali then urged Uthman to publicly repent, which he did. The caliph soon retracted his statement, however, possibly because his secretary Marwan convinced him that repentance would only embolden the opposition. On their way back home, some Egyptian rebels intercepted an official letter ordering their punishment. They now returned to Medina and laid siege to Uthman's residence for a second time, demanding that he abdicate. The caliph refused and claimed he was unaware of the letter, for which Marwan is often blamed in the early sources. Ali and another companion sided with Uthman about the letter, and suspected Marwan, while a report by the Sunni al-Baladhuri suggests that the caliph accused Ali of forging the letter. This is likely when Ali refused to further intercede for Uthman. That Ali was behind the letter is also the opinion of Leone Caetani. Giorgio Levi della Vida is unsure, while Wilferd Madelung strongly rejects the accusation, saying that it "stretches the imagination" in the absence of any evidence. In turn, he accuses Marwan, the bellicose secretary of Uthman, while Hugh N. Kennedy holds Uthman responsible for the letter. The caliph was assassinated soon afterward in the final days of 35 AH (June 656) by the Egyptian rebels during a raid on his residence in Medina.

Role of Ali in the assassination 
Ali played no role in the deadly attack, and his son Hasan was injured while guarding Uthman's besieged residence at the request of Ali. He also convinced the rebels not to prevent the delivery of water to Uthman's house during the siege. Beyond this, historians disagree about his measures to protect the third caliph. Ali is represented by al-Tabari as an honest negotiator genuinely concerned for Uthman. Husain M. Jafri and Madelung highlight multiple attempts by Ali for reconciliation, and Martin Hinds believes that Ali could not have done anything more for Uthman. Reza Shah-Kazemi points to Ali's "constructive criticism" of Uthman and his opposition to violence, while Moojan Momen writes that Ali mediated between Uthman and the rebels, urging the former to alter his policies and refusing the requests from the latter to lead them. This is similar to the view of John McHugo, who adds that Ali withdrew in frustration when his peace efforts where thwarted by Marwan. Fred Donner and Robert Gleave suggest that Ali was the immediate beneficiary of Uthman's death. This is challenged by Madelung, who argues that Aisha would have not actively opposed Uthman if Ali had been the prime mover of the rebellion and its future beneficiary. He and others observe the hostility of Aisha toward Ali, which resurfaced immediately after his accession in the Battle of the Camel. Laura Veccia Vaglieri notes that Ali refused to lead the rebellion but sympathized with them and possibly agreed with their calls for abdication. Hossein Nasr and Asma Afsaruddin, Levi della Vida, and Julius Wellhausen believe that Ali remained neutral, while Caetani labels Ali as the chief culprit in the murder of Uthman, even though the evidence suggests otherwise. Mahmoud M. Ayoub notes the often pro-Umayyad stance of the Western classical orientalists, with the exception of Madelung.

Ali and retribution for Uthman 
Ali was openly critical of the conduct of Uthman, though he generally neither justified his violent death nor condemned the killers. While he did not condone the assassination, Ali probably held Uthman responsible through his injustice for the protests which led to his death, a view for which Ismail Poonawala cites Waq'at Siffin. Madelung sides with this judgement of Ali from a judicial point of view, saying that Uthman probably did not sanction the murder of Niyar ibn Iyad Aslami, which triggered the deadly raid on his residence, but he obstructed justice by preventing an investigation into the murder, fearing that his aide Marwan was behind it. Still, in his letters to Mu'awiya and elsewhere, Ali insisted that he would bring the murderers to justice in due course, probably after establishing his authority. Quoting the Shia al-Ya'qubi and Ibn A'tham al-Kufi, Ayoub suggests that a mob from various tribes murdered Uthman and that Ali could have not punished them without risking widespread tribal conflict, even if he could identify them. Here, Farhad Daftary and John Kelsay say that the actual murderers soon fled (Medina) after the assassination, a view for which Jafri cites al-Tabari. A leading Egyptian rebel with links to Ali was his stepson, Muhammad ibn Abi Bakr, who was allegedly among those who killed Uthman. Some authors have rejected this accusation, though most seem to agree that Muhammad visited Uthman shortly before his death and rebuked him for his conduct. These two men and some other supporters of Ali were implicated by Mu'awiya in the assassination of Uthman. As such, some authors suggest that Ali was unwilling or unable to punish these individuals. The revenge for Uthman soon became the pretext for two revolts against Ali.

Election of Ali 
When Uthman was killed in 656 CE by the Egyptian rebels, the potential candidates for caliphate were Ali and Talha. The Umayyads had fled Medina, and the provincial rebels and the Ansar (early Medinan Muslims) were in control of the city. Among the Egyptians, Talha enjoyed some support, but the Basrans and Kufans, who had heeded Ali's call for nonviolence, and most of the Ansar supported Ali. Some authors add the (majority of the) Muhajirun to the above list of Ali's supporters. The key tribal chiefs also favored Ali at the time. The caliphate was offered by these groups to Ali, who was initially reluctant to accept it, saying that he preferred to be a minister. Some early reports emphasize that Ali then accepted the caliphate when it became clear that he enjoyed popular support, reporting also that Ali demanded a public pledge at the mosque. Perhaps he also accepted the caliphate so as to prevent further chaos, but his nomination by the rebels left Ali exposed to accusations of complicity in Uthman's assassination. It appears that Ali personally did not force anyone for pledge and, among others, Sa'ad ibn Abi Waqqas, Abd-Allah ibn Umar,  Sa'id ibn al-As, al-Walid ibn Uqba, and Marwan likely refused to give their oaths, some motivated by their personal grudges against Ali. On the whole, Madelung suggests that there is less evidence for any violence here than in the case of Abu Bakr, even though many broke with Ali later, claiming that they had pledged under duress. At the same time, that the majority favored Ali in Medina might have created an intimidating atmosphere for those opposed to him.

Opposition to Ali in Mecca

Talha and Zubayr 
Some early reports suggest that the duo pledged to Ali under duress. Ibn Abi Shayba writes that Talha told some in Basra that he pledged to Ali with a sword over his head in a walled garden. Hasan al-Basri too said that he saw Talha and Zubayr pledging to Ali with a sword over their head in a walled garden. Alternatively, a report by al-Baladhuri implies that Talha voluntarily paid his allegiance to Ali, while other reports by Ibn Sa'd, al-Tabari, al-Ya'qubi, al-Kufi (ninth century), and Ibn Abd Rabbih place Talha and Zubayr among the first who voluntarily pledged to Ali. Laura Veccia Vaglieri views the claims about coercion as an invented justification for the later violation of the pacts made by Talha and Zubayr. Gleave similarly dismisses the (Sunni) reports that Talha and Zubayr did not pledge or did so under duress, saying that these reports reflect their authors' attempts to provide a fuller context for their subsequent rebellion against Ali in the Battle of the Camel. Madelung argues that the election of Ali could have not happened without the pledge of Talha, as the main rival of Ali, but he also suggests that Talha did not come to the ceremony voluntarily and was dragged there by al-Ashtar. Alternatively, Hamid Mavani refers to a letter in Nahj al-balagha where Ali rebukes Talha and Zubayr before the Battle of the Camel for breaking their oaths after voluntarily offering them. Madelung also dismisses as legendary the report by al-Tabari about Zubayr's refusal to pledge.

Aisha 
Shortly before the assassination of Uthman, Aisha had called for the death of the caliph, as reported by al-Baladhuri. When she learned about the accession of Ali on her way back to Medina, she immediately returned to Mecca and publicly blamed the assassination on him, saying that a mere fingertip of Uthman was better than the whole of Ali. Citing Tarikh al-Ya'qubi and Tarikh Abulfeda, the Shia Muhammad H. Tabatabai similarly suggests that it was the succession of Ali that moved Aisha to action, rather than the assassination of Uthman. Some authors represent Aisha as an unwilling political victim in this saga, like one by al-Ya'qubi, and some say that she desired peace, while others emphasize her central role in mobilizing the rebel party against Ali, in favor of her close relatives, namely, Talha and Zubayr. This last group cites that Aisha gave speeches in Mecca and wrote letters to rally support against Ali. She did so ostensibly to seek justice for Uthman, although some question her motives, saying that she had earlier opposed Uthman. A representative view is that of Veccia Vaglieri, who writes that Aisha had been an opponent of Uthman. Even though she did not condone his assassination, Aisha could not bear to witness that Ali, whom she deeply hated, had benefited from the assassination. The opposition of Aisha as a Mother of the Faithful added credibility to the subsequent Meccan rebellion against Ali. Some reports by al-Baladhuri and al-Ya'qubi indicate that Aisha also attempted to persuade Umm Salama, another widow of Muhammad, to join her. According to al-Ya'qubi, she rejected the proposal and criticized Aisha for violating the Islamic rule of seclusion for the wives of Muhammad. Umm Salama then returned to Medina and gave her allegiance to Ali, as reported by al-Baladhuri and al-Tabari.

Umayyads 
The Umayyads fled Medina after the assassination of Uthman, notable among them his secretary, Marwan. Most of them gathered in Mecca, though some made their way to Damascus. Mecca was thus in open rebellion against Ali, and the rebels found an ally in Uthman's governor of the city, Abd-Allah ibn Amir. The Umayyads joined Talha and Zubayr in their opposition to Ali, although their objectives were different. These may have believed that the caliphate was their right after Uthman, suggests Madelung. Indeed, some of the Umayyads later left the campaign as it became clear for them that Talha and Zubayr were eying the caliphate upon victory. These included Sa'id ibn al-As and Abd Allah ibn Khalid ibn Asid. Among those who remained with the rebels were Marwan and Uthman's sons, namely, Aban and Walid.

Demands and motives 
The opposition to Ali decried his leniency towards the rebels, and accused him of complicity in the assassination. They demanded that Ali punish those responsible for the assassination of Uthman. They also called for the removal of Ali from office and for a (Qurayshite) council to appoint his successor. This removal of Ali was likely their primary goal, rather than vengeance for Uthman, against whom Talha, Zubayr, and Aisha had been active earlier. In particular, Talha and Aisha had likely written to the provinces to stir unrest. The caliphate of Ali perhaps frustrated the political ambitions of Talha and Zubayr, and the Quraysh in general. For these, Ali represented the Ansar and the lower classes of the society. Fearing that he would end their privileged status as the ruling class of Islam, the Quraysh thus challenged Ali to safeguard their entitlements. Their fears were soon confirmed as Ali opened the governorships to the Ansar. Ali was also vocal about the divine and exclusive right of Muhammad's kin to succeed him, which similarly jeopardized the future ambitions of other Qurayshites for leadership. In place of Ali, the opposition wished to restore the caliphate of Quraysh on the principles laid by Abu Bakr and Umar. 

Alternatively, Talha and Zubayr revolted after Ali refused to grant them favors. In particular, Ali did not offer the two any posts in his government, specifically the governorships of Basra and Kufa. There is, however, one report by al-Ya'qubi, according to which Ali offered the governorship of Yemen to Talha and the rule of al-Yamama and Bahrain to Zubayr, but the two asked for even more and Ali balked. For the Shia Tabatabai, the equal distribution of the treasury funds among Muslims by Ali antagonized Talha and Zubayr, while Hassan Abbas suggests that the two jumped ship when Ali began to reverse the excessive entitlements of the ruling elite during the caliphate of Uthman, under whom Talha and Zubayr had amassed considerable wealth. Veccia Vaglieri suggests that the triumvirate of Talha, Zubayr, and Aisha had opposed Uthman with plans for "moderate" changes after him which did not materialize under Ali. Then they revolted because apparently they feared the influence of extremists on him. Not only Talha and Zubayr, Ayoub suggests that the egalitarian policies of Ali also antagonized much of the Quraysh. Alternatively, a report by the Mu'tazilite Ibn Abi'l-Hadid suggests it was a letter by Mu'awiya that convinced Talha and Zubayr to revolt. The letter also offered them support should the duo seize the control of Kufa and Basra.

Preparations

Rebels' march on Basra 
In October 656, led by Aisha, Talha and Zubayr, six to nine hundred Meccan rebels marched on the garrison city of Basra, some 1300 kilometers away from Hejaz, where they were unable to muster much support. The war efforts were funded by the likes of Ya'la ibn Munya, Uthman's governor of Yemen who had brought the public funds with him to Mecca. Rivalling each other for the caliphate, Talha and Zubayr are said to have quarrelled for leading the prayers during the campaign, while Aisha mediated between them. As for her, al-Tabari and some others write that Aisha was disheartened by the incessant howling of dogs at a place called Hawab on the way to Basra, which is said to have reminded her of Muhammad's warning to his wives, "The day will come that the dogs of Hawab will bark at one of you, and that would be the day when she would be in manifest error." She was, however, dissuaded from any change of plans.

Rebel occupation of Basra 
The arrival of the rebels and their propaganda divided the Basrans for and against Ali, though they largely remained loyal to him, perhaps because Ali had earlier replaced Uthman's unpopular governor with the upright Uthman ibn Hunayf from the Ansar. Some apparently opposed Talha and his call for vengeance, having seen his earlier letters that called for Uthman's death. After an inconclusive fight, in which Ali's chief of police Hukaym ibn Jabala and many others were killed, both sides agreed to a truce until the arrival of Ali and the rebel army then camped outside of Basra. The agreement stipulated that governor's residence and the mosque and the treasury should remain under the governor's control, while the rebels were free to reside where they chose. Soon, however, they raided the town on "a cold, dark night with wind and rain," killing many and seizing the control of Basra and its treasury. The governor was tortured and then imprisoned, but later released and expelled from the city. Some (Sunni) traditions praise the moderation and self-defense of the rebels, though these are dismissed by Veccia Vaglieri. She says that the rebels must have instigated the violence as they needed provisions and money, and it was unfavorable for them to wait for Ali. This last point is also echoed by Madelung. The rebels then asked Basrans to surrender those who had participated in Uthman's siege and some six hundred men were thus killed by the rebels. The killings and the distribution of town supplies among the rebels are said to have driven a large number of Basrans to join Ali in fighting. In Basra, Aisha wrote letters to incite against Ali, addressed to Kufans and their governor, to Medinans, and to Hafsa bint Umar, another widow of Muhammad. The last one, however, refused to join the opposition.

Ali's march on Basra 
Ali had set off in pursuit earlier with about seven hundred men but failed to intercept the rebels in time. In al-Rabadha, he thus changed direction to Kufa and sent delegates to raise an army there. His first delegate was Hisham ibn Utba, a nephew of Sa'd ibn Abi Waqqas, according to al-Baladhuri and al-Dinawari. When the governor of Kufa, Abu Musa al-Ash'ari, hampered the war efforts, he was expelled from the town by the supporters of Ali, who then deposed the governor, saying that he had not found Abu Musa trustworthy and that he would have removed him earlier had it not been for al-Ashtar's advice to confirm him after the assassination of Uthman. Ali then sent his son Hasan and Ammar ibn Yasir or al-Ashtar himself to rally the support of the Kufans, who met the caliph outside of the town with an army of six to seven thousand men. Ali marched on Basra when his forces were ready, and stationed his army at the nearby al-Zawiya. From there, he sent messengers and letters to discourage the rebels from opposition, but to no avail.

Line-up 
The two armies soon camped across from each other just outside of Basra. After Ali appealed to the opposite camp, large numbers defected to his side, possibly tipping the numerical strength in his favor. Alternatively, Hugh N. Kennedy writes that Ali had brought a large following from Kufa whereas the rebels' support in Basra was modest. Asma Afsaruddin has a similar view. Alternatively, Hazleton says that both armies had about 10,000 men. Both armies were also multi-tribal and many tribes were represented on both sides, which must have created some hesitation among the soldiers. Many apparently withdrew, either because they did not wish to fight other Muslims, or because they did not want to take sides in a war between the prophet's cousin and his widow. This last one was apparently what the pro-Ali al-Ahnaf ibn Qays told Talha and Zubayr to keep his pro-Aisha tribesmen from fighting against Ali. For the rebels, Zubayr was the overall commander, while his son, Talha and his son, and Marwan were assigned to lead various divisions, reports the Twelver al-Mufid.

Negotiations 
A tent was pitched between the two armies where Ali, Talha, and Zubayr negotiated to avoid the impending war. There are reports, including some by al-Baladhuri and al-Tabari, to the effect that Ali reminded Zubayr of Muhammad's prediction that Zubayr would one day unjustly fight Ali. This reminder greatly disturbed Zubayr, writes al-Tabari, but he was persuaded to continue the campaign, contrary to the reports that he left before the battle. Another report by al-Mas'udi suggests that Ali reminded Talha of the prayer attributed to Muhammad at the Ghadir Khumm (632), where he is said to have implored God to befriend the friend of Ali and to be the enemy of his enemy. The report adds that this exchange convinced Talha to give up the leadership of the rebels. The details of the negotiations are not reliable for Madelung but he does conclude that the talks broke the resolve of Zubayr, who might have realized his small chances for the caliphate and perhaps the immorality of his bloody rebellion. At the negotiations, Aisha's party demanded the removal of Ali from office and a council to elect his successor, but Ali countered that he was the legitimate caliph. The two sides also accused each other of responsibility in the assassination of Uthman. The negotiations thus failed after three days and the two sides readied for battle. Alternatively, Hossein Nasr and his coauthor write that the negotiations were nearly successful but were sabotaged by those who had killed Uthman. Veccia Vaglieri similarly says that the "extremists" in Ali's camp provoked the war, while Madelung argues that the account of Sayf to this effect is fictitious and not backed by the other sources.

Battle

Rules of war 
Before the battle, Ali ordered that the wounded or captured enemies should not be killed. Those who surrender should not be fought, and those fleeing the battlefield should not be pursued. Only captured weapons and animals were to be considered war booty. These instructions form the basis for the ruling of the prominent Sunni Muhammad al-Shaybani about rebellions. Both rulings prohibit looting, but the ruling of al-Shaybani is said to be less generous than Ali's as the former allows for chasing the fugitives, killing the prisoners, and dispatching the wounded as long as the rebellion continues. Both rulings are, however, intended to uphold the rebels' rights as Muslims, even though they are considered a threat to order.

Aggressors 
After three days of failed negotiations, the battle took place near Basra on a December day in 656, lasting from noon to sunset, perhaps only four hours. Ali is said to have barred his men from commencing hostilities. Possibly in a last-ditch effort to avoid war, early sources widely report that the caliph ordered one of his men to raise a copy of the Quran between the battle lines and appeal to its contents. When this man was shot and killed by the rebel army, Ali gave the order to advance, according to al-Tabari and al-Baladhuri. The rebels were thus the aggressors and Ali might have wanted them to be seen as such.

Tactical developments 
The battle involved intense hand-to-hand combat, as reported by al-Baladhuri and al-Mufid. The latter adds that the caliph fought intensely during the battle. Nevertheless, the sources are mostly silent about the tactical developments, but Veccia Vaglieri suggests that the battle consisted of a series of duels and encounters, as this was the Arab custom at the time. Aisha was also led onto the battlefield, riding in an armored palanquin atop a red camel, after which the battle is named. Aisha was likely the rallying point of the rebel army, urging them to fight on with the battle cry of avenging Uthman. Ludwig W. Adamec similarly suggests that Aisha was on the battlefield to provide moral support for the rebels. Because of her presence on the battlefield, the rebel army continued to fight to defend her, even after both Talha and Zubayr were killed. The fighting was thus particularly fierce around Aisha's camel.

Death of Talha 
Talha was soon killed apparently by the Umayyad's Marwan, another rebel, who later told Uthman's son that he had now exacted revenge for Uthman, indicating that he held Talha responsible in the assassination of Uthman. Even so, Hassan Abbas suggests that Marwan's main motive in killing Talha was to rid his kinsman Mu'awiya of a serious contender for the caliphate. Marwan received only minor wounds during the battle, and afterward joined the court of Mu'awiya in Damascus. Madelung similarly believes that the murder of Talha was premeditated and postponed by Marwan long enough for him to be confident that he would not face any retribution from a victorious Aisha. In contrast, Ali Bahramian suggests that Marwan claimed to have killed Talha to gratify the Umayyads, who held Talha responsible in Uthman's death.

Death of Zubayr 
Zubayr, an experienced fighter, left shortly after the battle began, possibly without having fought at all, or after Talha was killed, or after single combat with Ammar, according to al-Tabari. Madelung and Veccia Vaglieri suggest that it was the serious misgivings of Zubayr about the justice of their cause that led Zubayr to desertion. Apparently al-Ahnaf ibn Qays, a pro-Ali chief of the Banu Sa'd, who had remained on the sidelines of the battle, learned about the desertion. Some of his men then followed and killed Zubayr, either to gratify Ali, or more likely for his dishonorable act of leaving other Muslims behind in a civil war he had ignited, as suggested by al-Ya'qubi, Ayoub, and Madelung. Some early sources introduce Amr ibn Jurmuz al-Muj'ashi'i as the killer and Wadi al-Siba near Basra as the location of his death. When the news of his death reached Ali, he commented that Zubayr had many times fought valiantly in front of Muhammad but that he had come to an evil end. This account is narrated by Marwan and also by Muhammad ibn Ibrahim ibn al-Harith al-Taymi, as reported by the prominent Twelver al-Mufid. This account is preferred by Shias because it suggests that Ali did not forgive Zubayr. According to another account, preferred by Sunnis, Ali said that the killer of Zubayr was damned to hell. In another version of this account, Ali adds that Zubayr was a good man, who made mistakes. Then he recites verse 15:47 and expresses hope that it applies to both Talha and Zubayr. The latter account is not credible in the opinion of Madelung.

Surrender of Aisha 
The deaths of Talha and Zubayr likely sealed the fate of the battle, despite the intense fighting that continued possibly for hours around Aisha's camel. One by one, the rebels stepped up to lead the camel and, one by one, they were killed. The fighting stopped only when Ali's troops succeeded in killing Aisha's camel and capturing the Mother of the Faithful. Surviving poems about the battle portray this final episode, while the lowest figures for the battle are 2500 dead from Aisha's side and 400-500 from Ali's army.

Aftermath

Pardon of Aisha 

Aisha was treated with respect and temporarily housed in Basra. Still, both Ali and his representative Ibn Abbas reprimanded Aisha as they saw her responsible for the loss of life and for leaving her home in violation of the Quran's instructions for Muhammad's widows. Ali later ordered Aisha's half-brother, Muhammad ibn Abi Bakr, to escort her back to Mecca or Medina. The treatment of Aisha is viewed by Shah-Kazemi as an example of Ali's magnanimity. Following her defeat, John Cappucci writes that Aisha acknowledged the caliphate of Ali. Some traditions indeed show Aisha as remorseful and that she wished not to have lived to witness the battle. In one such tradition, avoiding the battle is preferred over bearing ten sons for the prophet. Her view of Ali might have not changed though, suggests Madelung. He cites a tradition related by Kabsha bint Ka'b ibn Malik, in which Aisha praises Uthman and regrets that she incited revolt against him (but not against Ali). At any rate, her defeat put an end to her political ambitions, and she only engaged in a few minor political events henceforth. Her defeat was presumably cited to discourage medieval Muslim women from engaging in politics.

General pardon 
Ali announced a public pardon after the battle, setting free the war prisoners and prohibiting the enslavement of their women and children. The properties seized were to be returned to the enemy soldiers, otherwise to their legal Muslim heirs. Ali instead compensated his army from the treasury of Basra. These instructions upset those whom Madelung and Veccia Vaglieri describe as the radicals in the camp of Ali. The orders indeed later became a rallying cry for the Kharijites against Ali. The discontented soldiers questioned why they were not allowed to take enemy's possessions and enslave their women and children when shedding their blood was considered lawful. If that was to be the case, Ali retorted, then they had to first decide whom among them would take possession of the prophet's widow. With this ruling, Ali thus recognized his enemies' rights as Muslims. Alongside this, Ali also set the prisoners free upon his victory, and both practices were soon enshrined in the Islamic law. Ali also extended this pardon to high-profile rebels such as Marwan and the sons of Uthman, Talha, and Zubayr. A Qurayshite prisoner named Musahiq ibn Abd Allah ibn Makhrama al-Amiri relates that Ali asked them if he was not the closest to Muhammad in kinship and the most entitled to the leadership after his death. He then let them go after they pledged allegiance to him. A different report on the authority of Abu Mikhnaf states that a defiant Marwan was still let go without giving his oath of allegiance. Marwan soon after joined the court of Mu'awiya. For Madelung, that Ali released such a "dangerous and vicious enemy" signals how little he was willing to engage in the ongoing political games of the civil war.

Kufa as the de facto capital 
Before leaving Basra, Ali chastized its residents for breaking their oath of allegiance and dividing the community. He then appointed Ibn Abbas as the governor of Basra after receiving their renewed pledges. M.A. Shaban adds that Ali divided the treasury funds equally in Basra, which nevertheless remained a haven for years for pro-Uthman sentiments. The caliph soon set off for Kufa, arriving there in December 656 or January 657. He refused to reside in the governor's castle, calling it , and instead stayed with his nephew Ja'da ibn Hubayra. Kufa thus became Ali's main base of activity during his caliphate. With this move, the Medinan elite permanently lost their authority over the Muslim community, remarks Maria M. Dakake. Kennedy similarly highlights the strategic disadvantages of Medina, saying that it was far from population centers of Iraq and Syria, and heavily depended on grain shipments from Egypt. Kufa was to remain the main center of Shia Islam until mid-second century AH (mid-eighth century), when Baghdad was founded.

Participants

Army of Ali

Rebels

Others involved

See also

Notes

References

Bibliography

External links

 
 
 

656
Camel
First Fitna
History of Basra
Shia days of remembrance
Camel